The bag-1 internal ribosome entry site (IRES) is a cis-acting element located in the 5 ' untranslated region of the BAG-1 protein mRNA. Its effects apoptosis through IRES mediated translation of the BAG-1 protein.

When expressed, the BAG-1 protein is known to enhance the anti-apoptotic properties of the Bcl-2 protein. Although bag-1 translation usually occurs via a cap-dependent mechanism it has been found to contain an IRES in its 5' UTR. Translation via the IRES has been found to be common following heat shock when cap-dependent scanning is compromised.

References

External links
 

Cis-regulatory RNA elements